Tony Leiker is a former defensive end in the National Football League.

Biography
Leiker was born Anthony Wade Leiker on September 26, 1964 in Hays, Kansas.

Career
Leiker was drafted in the seventh round of the 1987 NFL Draft by the Green Bay Packers and was a member of the team that season. He played at the collegiate level at Stanford University. While at Stanford Leiker tested positive for steroids.

See also
List of Green Bay Packers players

References

People from Hays, Kansas
Green Bay Packers players
American football defensive ends
Stanford Cardinal football players
Coffeyville Red Ravens football players